Rita Sen  is an Indian athlete. She won a Silver  medal in  4 × 400 m relay in the 1982 Asian Games.

References

Living people
Athletes (track and field) at the 1982 Asian Games
Asian Games silver medalists for India
Asian Games medalists in athletics (track and field)
Medalists at the 1982 Asian Games
Indian female sprinters
Year of birth missing (living people)